Flash, flashes, or FLASH may refer to:

Arts, entertainment, and media

Fictional aliases
 Flash (DC Comics character), several DC Comics superheroes with super speed:
 Flash (Barry Allen)
 Flash (Jay Garrick)
 Wally West, the first Kid Flash and third adult Flash
 Bart Allen, the second Kid Flash who also became the adult hero for a time
 Flash (G.I. Joe), a character in the G.I. Joe universe
 Flash, a robot in the video game Brave Saga 2
 Flash, a character in the comedy film Daddy Day Care (2003)
 Flash, a character in the TV science fiction drama Real Humans
 Flash, a character in the 1989 American action comedy movie Speed Zone
 Flash, a character in the TV sitcom Step by Step
 Flash, a character in the film Zootopia (2016)
 Flash Gordon, the titular hero of science fiction comic strip
 Flash Sentry, in My Little Pony: Friendship is Magic
 Flash Thompson, a Marvel comic book character
 Flash, known as Furzz in the US, an anthropomorphic rabbit from Roary the Racing Car

Films
 Flash (1997 film), Disney Channel
 Flash (2007 film), Malayalam
 The Flash (film), a US planned release

Games
 Flash (pinball), a 1979 Williams pinball game designed by Steve Ritchie
 Teen patti or Flash, a three-card poker-style game, popular in South Asia
 The Flash (video game), a 1991 action video game

Literature

Comics
 Flash Comics, a 1940s anthology comic book
 The Flash (DC Rebirth), a comic book in the DC Rebirth relaunch
 The Flash (comic book), an ongoing comic book featuring the titular DC Comics hero

Other literature
 Flash (Krentz novel), a 1998 romance novel by Jayne Ann Krentz
 Flash (Modesitt novel), a 2004 science fiction novel by L. E. Modesitt
 Flash (newspaper), a community newspaper of Auckland City, New Zealand

Music

Artists
 Flash (band), a 1970s progressive rock group

Albums and EPs
 Flash (Amoyamo album) (2013)
 Flash (EP), a 2010 extended play album by Crystal Kay
 Flash (Jeff Beck album) (1985)
 Flash (Electric Food album) (1970)
 Flash (Flash album) (1972)
 Flash (Moving Sidewalks album) (1968)
 Flash (Towa Tei album) (2005)
 Flash, a 1996 album by Red Five

Songs
 "Flash" (Iggy Azalea song), 2012
 "Flash" (B.B.E. song), 1997
 "Flash" (Perfume song), 2016
 "Flash" (Queen song), 1980
 "Flash" (Stéphanie song), 1986
 "Flash" (X1 song), 2019
 "Flashes" (song), a 1931 composition by Bix Beiderbecke

Television
 The Flash (1990 TV series), a 1990 American superhero series
 The Flash (2014 TV series), a 2014 American superhero series

Military
 FLASH (Z), a military message precedence designation
 M202 FLASH, a rocket launcher
 Operation Flash, a May 1995 Croatian Army offensive in Western Slavonia
 Tactical recognition flash, a coloured patch worn on the arm of combat clothing to distinguish their regiment or corps

People

In arts and entertainment
 Flash (wrestler) (born 1957), masked professional wrestler
 Flash Brown (born 1981), pornographic actor and basketball player
 Adam Flash (born 1971), American professional wrestler
 Flash Flanagan (born 1974), American professional wrestler
 Grandmaster Flash (born 1958), American hip hop musician and DJ
 Larry "Flash" Jenkins (born 1955), American actor, film director, producer, and screenwriter
 Scott Norton (born 1961), American professional wrestler
 Flash Terry (1934–2004), American guitarist and singer

In sport

 Flash, on the TV show American Gladiators
 Gabriel Elorde (1935–1985), Filipino professional boxer
 Richard Flash (born 1976), English footballer
 Josh Gordon (born 1991), American football player
 Flash Hollett (1911–1999), Canadian ice hockey defenceman
 Cordarrelle Patterson (born 1991), American football player
 Gordon Shedden (born 1979), British racing driver
 Dwyane Wade (born 1982), American basketball player
 Lee Young-ho (born 1992), South Korean professional Starcraft player also known as "Flash"

Other people
 George Flash (1909–1990), Israeli politician
 Sandy Flash (died 1778), American highwayman
 Mark Kennedy (policeman), known undercover as Flash or Mark Stone

Places
 Flash, Staffordshire, England, a village
 The Flash (lake), a lake near Borras, Wales

Science and technology

Computing
 Adobe Flash (formerly Shockwave Flash and Macromedia Flash), multimedia platform software
 Flash memory, a kind of non-volatile computer memory
 Flash!, the bundled graphics package for the SAM Coupé

Other uses in science and technology
 Flash (manufacturing), an excess material attached to a moulded product along a parting line
 Flash (photography), instantaneous illumination for picture taking
 FLASH, a particle physics facility in Germany
 Flash lightning, a lightning burst within a cloud (Intracloud)
 FlAsH-EDT2 or FlAsH tag, a fluorescent label for proteins
 Fly Castelluccio Flash, an Italian paramotor design
 Hook flash in telephony, often labelled on buttons as simply 'flash'
 M202 FLASH, a rocket launcher
 Tilbury Flash, an American racing monoplane built in the 1930s
 Fast low angle shot magnetic resonance imaging (FLASH), an MRI pulse-sequence

Sports

 Flash (juggling), a type of throwing and catching
 Delaware Blue Coats, originally the Utah Flash, an NBA Development League team
 Flash Engineering, a Swedish motorsports team
 Flash Stakes, a former Thoroughbred horse race
 Kent State Golden Flashes or just the Flashes, the athletics teams of Kent State University
 Las Vegas Flash, an inline hockey team in 1994
 Monterrey Flash, a Mexican indoor soccer team formed in 2011
 Rochester Flash, a former American Soccer League team
 San Diego Flash, a soccer team based in San Diego, California
 Western New York Flash, an American women's soccer franchise

Other uses
 Flash (cleaning product), the trading name of Mr. Clean in the UK and Ireland
 Flash (lake),  a body of water that forms where the land below it has subsided
 Flash (tattoo), a source pattern for body art
 Flash, to expose a person's private parts to another person in exhibitionism
 Flash, a lightning bolt symbol, for example in Flash and Circle
 Flash Airlines, a private charter airline operating out of Cairo, Egypt
 Flash BRT, a bus rapid transit network in Montgomery County, Maryland
 Flash (magazine), a quarterly Australian photography magazine

See also
 Flashing (disambiguation)